Trachelas quisquiliarum, is a species of spider of the genus Trachelas. It is endemic to Sri Lanka.

See also
 List of Trachelidae species

References

Trachelidae
Endemic fauna of Sri Lanka
Spiders of Asia
Spiders described in 1906